Eastpointe High School (formerly known as East Detroit High School) is a high school in Eastpointe, Michigan, United States. It serves students in grades 912 for the Eastpointe Community Schools district.

History
The district voted to change the name on May 23, 2017, from East Detroit High School to Eastpointe High School.

Notable alumni 
 Matt Hernandez, football player
 Ron Kramer, multi-sport college athlete and professional football player
 Jerry M. Linenger, former NASA astronaut
 Woody Brown (actor), actor on Flamingo Road (TV series)
 Misty Lee, voice actress, comedian, activist and magician.

References

External links 

 Eastpointe Community Schools

Public high schools in Michigan
Schools in Macomb County, Michigan